Antipovka is a rural locality (a selo) and the administrative center of Antipovskoye Rural Settlement, Kamyshinsky District, Volgograd Oblast, Russia. The population was 2,905 as of 2010. There are 33 streets.

Geography 
Antipovka is located on the right bank of the Volgograd Reservoir, 45 km south of Kamyshin (the district's administrative centre) by road. Bykovo is the nearest rural locality.

References 

Rural localities in Kamyshinsky District
Kamyshinsky Uyezd